Independent Division of Jiangxi Provincial Military District(2nd Formation) was formed in February 1976. The division was composed of four regiments (1st to 3rd infantry, artillery). The division stationed in Nanchang, Jiangxi.

In December 1980 the division was disbanded.

References

Infantry divisions of the People's Liberation Army
Military units and formations established in 1976
Military units and formations disestablished in 1980